Jean Lannes, 1st Duke of Montebello, Prince of Siewierz (10 April 1769 – 31 May 1809), was a French military commander and a Marshal of the Empire who served during both the French Revolutionary and Napoleonic Wars.

He was one of Napoleon's most daring and talented generals, and is regarded by many as one of history's greatest military commanders. Napoleon once commented on Lannes: "I found him a pygmy and left him a giant". A personal friend of the emperor, he was allowed to address him with the familiar tu, as opposed to the formal vous.

Early life

Lannes was born in the small town of Lectoure, in the province of Gascony in Southern France. He was the son of a small landowner and merchant, Jeannet Lannes (1733–1812), son of Jean Lannes (d. 1746), a farmer, and his wife, Jeanne Pomiès (d. 1770), and paternal grandson of Pierre Lane and wife Bernarde Escossio (both died in 1721), and wife Cécile Fouraignan (1741–1799), daughter of Bernard Fouraignan and wife Jeanne Marguerite Laconstère. He was apprenticed in his teens to a dyer. Lannes received little education, but his great strength and proficiency in many sports caused him in 1792 to be elected sergeant-major of the battalion of volunteers of Gers, which he had joined upon the outbreak of war between France and Spain. He served under General Jean-Antoine Marbot during the campaigns in the Pyrenees in 1793 and 1794, and rose by distinguished conduct to the rank of chef de brigade. During his time in the Pyrenees, Lannes was given some important tasks by General Jacques François Dugommier and recommended for promotion by future Marshal Louis-Nicolas Davout.

Campaigns of Italy and Egypt

Lannes served under General Barthélemy Louis Joseph Schérer, taking part in the Battle of Loano. However, in 1795, as a result of the reforms of the army introduced by the Thermidorians, he was dismissed from his rank. He re-enlisted as a simple volunteer in the French Armée d'Italie. He served in the Italian campaign of 1796, and climbed his way up to high rank once again, being given command of a brigade in General Pierre Augereau’s division and later of 3 battalions of the permanent advance guard at different times. Lannes was distinguished in every battle and played an important role in the victory at Dego. At the Battle of Bassano, he captured two enemy flags with his own hands and received multiple wounds at the Battle of Arcole but kept leading his column in person.

Lannes led troops under Claude Victor-Perrin in the invasion of the Papal States. When he and a small reconnaissance party ran into 300 Papal cavalry, he averted danger by astutely ordering the men to return to base, convincing them not to attack.

He was chosen by Bonaparte to accompany him to Egypt as commander in one of General Jean-Baptiste Kléber's brigades, in which capacity he greatly distinguished himself, especially during the retreat from Syria. Lannes was wounded at the Battle of Abukir, before he returned to France with Bonaparte, and assisted him in the Coup of 18 Brumaire. After Bonaparte's takeover and appointment as Consul of France, Lannes was promoted to the ranks of general of division and commandant of the consular guard.

Back with the Armée d'Italie, Lannes commanded the advanced guard in the crossing of the Alps in 1800, was instrumental in winning the Battle of Montebello, from which he afterwards took his title, and played a large part in the Battle of Marengo.

Napoleonic Wars

General Joachim Murat and Chef de brigade Jean-Baptiste Bessières schemed to have Lannes removed over a budget deficit, but Augereau bailed him out. As a result, Lannes was not totally disgraced, but was instead sent as ambassador to Portugal in 1801. Opinions differ as to his merits in this capacity; Napoleon never made such use of him again. Lannes purchased the seventeenth-century Château de Maisons, near Paris, in 1804 and had one of its state apartments redecorated for a visit from Napoleon.

Upon the establishment of the First French Empire, he was made one of the original eighteen Marshals of the Empire. In 1805, he fully regained Napoleon's favour, which he lost during the consulate. At Austerlitz, he commanded the left wing of the Grande Armée. During the War of the Fourth Coalition, Lannes was at his best, commanding his corps with the greatest credit in the march through the Thuringian Forest, the Battle of Saalfeld (which is studied as a model today at the French Staff College), and the Battle of Jena. His leadership of the advance guard at Friedland was even more prominent.

In 1807, Napoleon recreated the Duchy of Siewierz (Sievers), granting it to Lannes after Prussia was forced to cede all her acquisitions from the second and third partitions of Poland.

After this, Lannes was to be tested as a commander-in-chief, for Napoleon sent him to Spain in 1808 and gave him a detached wing of the army to command, with which he won a crushing victory over General Francisco Castaños at Tudela on 22 November. In January 1809, he was sent to capture Zaragoza, and by 21 February, after one of the most stubborn defences in history, Lannes was in possession of the place. He later said, "this damned Bonaparte is going to get us all killed" after his last campaign in Spain. In 1808, Napoleon made him Duke of Montebello, and in 1809, for the last time, gave him command of the advance guard. He took part in the engagements around Eckmühl and the advance on Vienna. With his corps, he led the French Army across the Danube River and bore the brunt, with Marshal André Masséna, at the Battle of Aspern-Essling.

Death

On 22 May 1809, during a lull in the second day of the Battle of Aspern-Essling, Lannes went and sat down at the edge of a ditch, his hand over his eyes and his legs crossed.

As he sat there, plunged in gloomy meditation on having seen his friend, General Pierre Charles Pouzet, decapitated mid-conversation by a cannonball, a second cannonball fired from a gun at Enzersdorf ricocheted and struck him just where his legs crossed. The knee-pan of one was smashed, and the back sinews of the other torn. The marshal said, "I am wounded; it's nothing much; give me your hand to help me up." He tried to rise, but could not.

He was carried to the tête de pont, where the chief surgeons proceeded to dress his wound. One of Lannes' legs was amputated within two minutes by Dominique Jean Larrey. He bore the painful operation with courage; it was hardly over when Napoleon came up and, kneeling beside the stretcher, wept as he embraced the marshal. Eight days later, Lannes succumbed to his painful wounds at daybreak on 31 May.

He was initially buried in Les Invalides, Paris, but in 1810, he was exhumed and reinterred in the Panthéon national after a grandiose ceremony.

Family
Lannes married twice, in Perpignan on 19 March 1795 to Paulette Méric, whom he divorced because of infidelity in 1800, after she had given birth to an illegitimate son while he was serving in Egypt:
 Jean-Claude Lannes de Montebello (Montauban, 12 February 1799 – 1817), who died unmarried and without issue,

His second marriage was at Dornes on 16 September 1800 to Louise Antoinette, Comtesse de Guéhéneuc (Paris, 26 February 1782 – Paris, 3 July 1856), by whom he had five children:
 Louis Napoléon (30 July 1801 – 19 July 1874)
 Alfred-Jean (11 July 1802 – 20 June 1861)
 Jean-Ernest (20 July 1803 – 24 November 1882)
 Gustave-Olivier (4 December 1804 – 25 August 1875)
 Josephine-Louise (4 March 1806 – 8 November 1889)
One succeeded in his titles and three others used the courtesy title of baron. One of his direct descendants, Philippe Lannes de Montebello, was the director of the Metropolitan Museum of Art until 2008.

Assessment

Lannes ranks with Louis-Nicolas Davout and André Masséna as the ablest of all of Napoleon's marshals. He was continually employed in tasks requiring the utmost resolution and daring, and more especially when the emperor's combinations depended upon the vigour and self-sacrifice of a detachment or fraction of the army. It was thus with Lannes at Friedland and at Aspern as it was with Davout at Austerlitz and Auerstedt, and Napoleon's estimate of his subordinates' capacities can almost exactly be judged by the frequency with which he used them to prepare the way for his own shattering blow. Dependable generals with the usual military virtue, or careful and exact troop leaders like Jean-de-Dieu Soult and Jacques MacDonald, were kept under Napoleon's own hand for the final assault which he himself launched; the long hours of preparatory fighting against odds of two to one, which alone made the final blow possible, he entrusted only two men of extraordinary courage and high capacity for command. Lannes' place in his affections was never filled.

Miscellaneous 
A chocolate cake, the "Gâteau au chocolat de la Maréchale de Lannes", is named after him.

Notes

References
 
 Clausewitz, Carl von (2018). Napoleon's 1796 Italian Campaign. Trans and ed. Nicholas Murray and Christopher Pringle. Lawrence, Kansas: University Press of Kansas.

External links
 

1769 births
1809 deaths
Burials at the Panthéon, Paris
 1
French military personnel killed in the Napoleonic Wars
French military personnel of the French Revolutionary Wars
French Republican military leaders of the French Revolutionary Wars
Marshals of the First French Empire
Names inscribed under the Arc de Triomphe
People from Gers
 1